Transamerica Retirement Solutions, is a recently renamed full service retirement firm formed via the mergers of several “AEGON” companies including Transamerica Retirement Services, The Employer Solutions and Pensions Group of Transamerica, Clark Consulting and Diversified Investment Advisors. "Once a traditional mid market financial investment/record keeping firm that specialized in corporate retirement plans, with an average participant size of about 1,000 to 5,000 employees, they are active in the “RFP” process in nearly every market nationally, except perhaps mega plans.  They have received >40 cups in recent Plan Sponsor Survey’s across varied segments of the retirement market as measured by Chatham Partners and Plan Sponsor Magazine. In this new configuration they have > 3,000 employees ."

History 
The prior Diversified Investment Advisors Division was established as an original division of MONY (Mutual of NY) and its predecessors. Diversified spun off as a separate entity in the early 1990s.  

The company’s activity covers the entire spectrum of defined benefit and defined contribution plans including: 401(k), 403(b) (Traditional and Roth IRA's), 401(a), 457(b), non-qualified deferred compensation, profit sharing, money purchase, traditional DB, DB non-qualified, cash balance, and Taft-Hartley plans. Transamerica provides comprehensive total retirement outsourcing (TRO) inclusive of plan administration, investment and communication services for all sizes of organizations, with a specializations in the healthcare market.

Headquartered in Cedar Rapids, Iowa, the company’s regional offices are located in Saint Petersburg, Florida, Denver, Colorado, Baltimore, Maryland, Canton, Massachusetts (Actuarial Consulting Group and Large Market DC ), Harrison, New York, and Charlotte, North Carolina.

They have corporate relationships with Transamerica Life and are a wholly owned subsidiary of Aegon N.V. headquartered in The Hague, Netherlands.

References

Management consulting firms of the United States
Companies based in New York (state)